Leon County is a county in the Panhandle of the U.S. state of Florida. It was named after the Spanish explorer Juan Ponce de León. As of the 2020 census, the population was 292,198.

The county seat is Tallahassee, which is also the state capital and home to many politicians, lobbyists, jurists, and attorneys.

Leon County is included in the Tallahassee metropolitan area. Tallahassee is home to two of Florida's major public universities, Florida State University and Florida A&M University, as well as Tallahassee Community College. Together these institutions have a combined enrollment of more than 70,000 students annually, creating both economic and social effects.

History

Originally part of Escambia and later Gadsden County, Leon County was created in 1824. It was named after Juan Ponce de León, the Spanish explorer who was the first European to reach Florida.

The United States finally acquired this territory in the 19th century. In the 1830s, it attempted to conduct Indian Removal of the Seminole and Creek peoples, who had migrated south to escape European-American encroachment in Georgia and Alabama. After many Seminole were forcibly removed from the area or moved south to the Everglades during the Seminole Wars, planters developed cotton plantations based on enslaved labor.

By the 1850s and 1860s, Leon County had become part of the Deep South's "cotton kingdom". It ranked fifth of all Florida and Georgia counties in cotton production from the 20 major plantations. Uniquely among Confederate capitals east of the Mississippi River, in the American Civil War Tallahassee was never captured by Union forces. No Union soldiers set foot in Leon County until the Reconstruction Era.

Geography
Unlike much of Florida, most of Leon County has rolling hills, as part of Florida's Red Hills Region.

Geology

Leon County encompasses basement rock composed of basalts of the Triassic and Jurassic from ~251 to 145 million years ago interlayered with Mesozoic sedimentary rocks. The layers above the basement are carbonate rock created from dying foraminifera, bryozoa, mollusks, and corals from as early as the Paleocene, a period of ~66—55.8 Ma.

During the Eocene (~55.8—33.9 Ma) and Oligocene (~33.9—23 Ma), the Appalachian Mountains began to uplift and the erosion rate increased enough to fill the Gulf Trough with quartz sands, silts, and clays via rivers and streams. The first sedimentation layer in Leon County is the Oligocene Suwannee Limestone in the southeastern part of the county as stated by the United States Geological Survey and Florida Geological Survey.

The Early Miocene (~23.03—15.7 Ma) sedimentation in Leon County is Hawthorn Group, Torreya Formation and St. Marks Formation and found in the northern two-thirds of the county.

The Pliocene (~5.332—2.588 Ma) is represented by the Miccosukee Formation scattered within the Torreya Formation.

Sediments were laid down from the Pleistocene epoch (~2.588 million—12 000 years ago) through Holocene epoch (~12,000—present) and are designated Beach ridge and trail and undifferentiated sediments.

Terraces and shorelines
During the Pleistocene, what would be Leon County emerged and submerged with each glacial and interglacial period. Interglacials created the county's topography.

Also See Leon County Pleistocene coastal terraces

Also see: Florida Platform and Lithostratigraphy

Geologic formations
 Red Hills Region (North)
 Cody Scarp (central)
 Woodville Karst Plain (South)

Paleontology
Three sites in Leon County have yielded fossil remnants of the Miocene epoch.

National protected area
 Apalachicola National Forest (part)

Bodies of water
 Lake Miccosukee
 Black Creek
 Lake Bradford
 Lake Ella
 Lake Hall
 Lake Iamonia
 Lake Jackson
 Lake Lafayette
 Lake Talquin
 Ochlockonee River
 Lake Munson

Adjacent counties
 Grady County, Georgia - north
 Thomas County, Georgia - northeast
 Jefferson County - east
 Wakulla County - south
 Gadsden County - west
 Liberty County - west

Demographics

2020 census

As of the 2020 United States census, there were 292,198 people, 116,530 households, and 61,961 families residing in the county.

2010 census

Race
As of the census of 2010, there were 275,487 people, and 108,592 households residing in the county. The racial makeup of the county was 63.0% White, 30.3% Black or African American, 0.3% Native American, 2.9% Asian, 0.1% Pacific Islander, and 2.2% from two or more races. 5.6% of the population were Hispanic or Latino of any race.

Age
There were 108,592 households, out of which 24.2% had children under the age of 18 living with them, 36.9% were married couples living together, 13.1% had a female householder with no husband present, and 45.8% were non-families. 31.0% of all households were made up of individuals, and 6.1% had someone living alone who was 65 years of age or older. The average household size was 2.29 and the average family size was 2.92.

In the county, the population was spread out, with 20.0% under the age of 18, 26.3% from 18 to 24, 22.7% from 25 to 44, 22.4% from 45 to 64, and 8.7% who were 65 years of age or older. The median age was 27.8 years. For every 100 females, there were 91.57 males. For every 100 females age 18 and over, there were 89.03 males.

Education
At 70.2%, Leon County enjoys the highest level of post-secondary education in the state of Florida, followed by Alachua County with a total of 67.8%.

Source of above:

Income
The median income for a household in the county was $37,517, and the median income for a family was $52,962. Males had a median income of $35,235 versus $28,110 for females. The per capita income for the county was $21,024. About 9.40% of families and 18.20% of the population were below the poverty line, including 16.20% of those under age 18 and 8.20% of those age 65 or over.

Accolades
 2007 National Association of County Park and Recreation Officials' Environmental and Conservation Award for exceptional effort to reclaim, restore, preserve, acquire or develop unique and natural areas. Leon County has  of open space, forest and woodlands between the Miccosukee Canopy Road Greenway and J.R. Alford Greenway.

Law, government, and politics

Politics

Following Reconstruction, white Democrats regained power in Leon County and voters have historically voted for Democratic candidates at the national level. Tallahassee is one of the few cities in the South known for progressive activism.

The county has voted Democratic in 24 of the past 29 presidential elections since 1904. (Until the late 1960s, blacks were essentially disenfranchised in Florida and other Southern states.) Since the civil rights era, Tallahassee has elected black mayors and black state representatives. Its political affiliations likely draw from the high number of students, staff, and faculty associated with Florida State University, Florida A&M University, and Tallahassee Community College in Tallahassee, as well as the concentration of government employees.

Leon County has had the highest voter turnout of any Florida county. In the 2008 general election, it had a record-setting voter turnout of 85%, including early voting and voting by mail.

As of October 6, 2020, there were 116,294 Democrats, 57,791 Republicans, and 43,369 voters with other affiliations in Leon County.

County representation

 Map of County Commission Districts

State representation
Allison Tant (D), District 9, represents Leon County's northern half, including most of Tallahassee. Jason Shoaf (R), District 7, represents the county's southern portion. He won office in a special election. Ramon Alexander (D), District 8, represents a west-central portion of the county.

State Senator
All of Leon County is represented by Loranne Ausley (D), District 3, in the Florida Senate.

U.S. Congressional representation
Leon County is in two congressional districts. Its northern and eastern portion, including 61% of Tallahassee, is part of the 5th Congressional District, a minority-majority district that extends across northern Florida. It is represented by Al Lawson (D). The remainder of the county (the southeastern corner and 39% of Tallahassee), is part of the 2nd Congressional District, represented by Neal Dunn (R).

Consolidation
Leon County voters have gone to the polls four times to vote on consolidation of the Tallahassee and Leon County governments into one jurisdiction. This proposal would combine police and other city services with the already shared (consolidated) Tallahassee Fire Department, Tallahassee/Leon County Planning Department, and Leon County Emergency Medical Services. Roughly 36 percent of Leon County's 250,000 residents live outside the Tallahassee city limits.

Proponents of consolidation have claimed that the new jurisdiction would attract business by its very size. Merging of governments would cut government waste, duplication of services, etc. Professor Richard Feiock of Florida State University found in a 2007 study that he could not conclude that consolidation would benefit the local economy.

Public services

Leon County Sheriff
The Leon County Sheriff's Office provides police patrol and detective service for the unincorporated part of the county. The sheriff's office also provides court protection and operates the county jail. Fire and emergency medical services are provided by the Tallahassee Fire Department and Leon County Emergency Medical Services.

Tallahassee Police Department
Tallahassee is the only incorporated municipality in Leon County. The Tallahassee Police Department provides its policing. Established in 1826, TPD is the country's third-longest-accredited law enforcement agency.

Education

Higher education

Florida State University
Florida State University (commonly called Florida State or FSU) is an American public space-grant and sea-grant research university. It has a 1,391.54-acre (5.631-km2) campus in Tallahassee. In 2017, it had nearly 42,000 students. It is a senior member of the State University System of Florida. Founded in 1851, it is on Florida's oldest continuous site of higher education.

The university is classified as a Research University with Very High Research by the Carnegie Foundation for the Advancement of Teaching. It comprises 16 separate colleges and more than 110 centers, facilities, labs and institutes that offer more than 360 programs of study, including professional school programs. The university has an annual budget of over $1.7 billion. Florida State is home to Florida's only National Laboratory, the National High Magnetic Field Laboratory, and is the birthplace of the commercially viable anti-cancer drug Taxol. FSU also operates the John & Mable Ringling Museum of Art, the State Art Museum of Florida and one of the nation's largest museum/university complexes.

FSU is accredited by the Southern Association of Colleges and Schools (SACS). It is home to nationally ranked programs in many academic areas, including law, business, engineering, medicine, social policy, film, music, theater, dance, visual art, political science, psychology, social work, and the sciences. FSU leads Florida in four of eight areas of external funding for the STEM disciplines.

For 2019, U.S. News & World Report ranked Florida State the country's 26th-best public university.

Florida Governor Rick Scott and the state legislature designated FSU one of two "preeminent" state universities in the spring of 2013 among the 12 universities of the State University System of Florida.

FSU's intercollegiate sports teams, commonly called the Seminoles, compete in National Collegiate Athletic Association (NCAA) Division I and the Atlantic Coast Conference (ACC). The athletics programs are favorites of passionate students, fans and alumni across the country, especially when led by the Marching Chiefs of the Florida State University College of Music. In their 113-year history, the Seminoles have won 20 national athletic championships and Seminole athletes have won 78 individual NCAA national championships.

Florida A&M University

Founded on October 3, 1887, Florida A&M University (FAMU) is a public, historically black university that is part of the State University System of Florida and is accredited by the Southern Association of Colleges and Schools. In 2016 it had more than 9,600 students. FAMU also has several satellite campuses. Its College of Law is at its Orlando site, and its pharmacy program has sites in Miami, Jacksonville and Tampa. FAMU offers 54 bachelor's degrees and 29 master's degrees. It has 12 schools and colleges and one institute.

FAMU has 11 doctoral programs, including ten Ph.D. programs: chemical engineering, civil engineering, electrical engineering, mechanical engineering, industrial engineering, biomedical engineering, physics, pharmaceutical sciences, educational leadership, and environmental sciences. Top undergraduate programs are architecture, journalism, computer information sciences, and psychology. FAMU's top graduate programs include pharmaceutical sciences, public health, physical therapy, engineering, physics, master's of applied social sciences (especially history and public administration), business, and sociology.

Tallahassee Community College

The Florida Legislature founded Tallahassee Community College in 1966. TCC is a member of the Florida College System. It is accredited by the Florida Department of Education and the Southern Association of Colleges and Schools. Its primary site is a 270-acre (1.092 km2) campus in Tallahassee.

TCC offers Bachelor's of Science, Associate of Arts, Associate of Science, and Associate of Applied Sciences degrees. In 2013, it was 1st in the nation in graduating students with A.A. degrees. TCC is also the nation's #1 transfer school to Florida State University. As of 2015, TCC had 38,017 students.

In partnership with Florida State University, TCC offers the TCC2FSU program. This program provides guaranteed admission to FSU for TCC Associate in Arts degree graduates.

List of other colleges
 Barry University School of Adult and Continuing Education – Tallahassee Campus
 Embry-Riddle Aeronautical University
 Flagler College – Tallahassee Campus
 Keiser University – Tallahassee Campus
 Lewis M. Lively Area Vocational-Technical School
 Saint Leo University – Tallahassee Campus

Primary and secondary education
The Leon County School District administers and operates Leon County's public schools. LCS is operated by a superintendent, 5 board members, and 1 student representative. There are 25 elementary schools, 10 middle schools, seven high schools, eight special/alternative schools, and two charter schools.

List of middle schools

List of high schools

Libraries
Leon County operates the Leroy Collins Leon County Public Library, with 7 branches serving the county:
 Leroy Collins Main Library
 Northeast Branch Library
 Eastside Branch Library
 Dr. B.L. Perry, Jr. Branch Library
 Lake Jackson Branch Library
 Woodville Branch Library
 Jane G. Sauls Fort Braden Branch Library

The Leon County Public Library was renamed in 1993 to honor LeRoy Collins, the 33rd governor of Florida.

History of library services

The Carnegie Library of Tallahassee provided library services to the black community before desegregation. It was the first and only public library in Tallahassee until 1955. Philanthropist Andrew Carnegie offered Tallahassee money to build a public library in 1906. According to Africology: The Journal of Pan African Studies, the library was built on the FAMU campus because the city refused the donation because it would have to serve the black citizens. "The facility boasted modern amenities such as electricity, indoor plumbing and water supplied by the city. In later years, the Library served as an art gallery, religious center, and in 1976, became the founding home of the Black Archives Research Center and Museum. By functioning both as a repository for archival records and a museum for historical regalia, the center continues to render academic support to educational institutions, civic, political, religious and Museum. By functioning both as a repository for archival records and a museum for historical regalia, the center continues to render academic support to educational institutions, civic, political, religious and social groups, as well as, public and private businesses throughout Florida and the nation." The building was designed by noted architect William Augustus Edwards and was built in 1908. On November 17, 1978, it was added to the U.S. National Register of Historic Places.

The Carnegie Library of Tallahassee, which served only the black community, became the only free public library in the city until 1955. According to the Leon County Public Library's website, the American Association of University Women formed the Friends of the Library organization in 1954. The formation of the Friends of the Library was in direct response to the fact that "Tallahassee was the only state capital in the United States not offering free public library service." A year later, the library was established by legislative action and developed by citizens and civic groups. The first Leon County free public library opened on March 21, 1956. The first building to house the library was The Columns, one of the oldest remaining antebellum homes in the Leon County area, at Park Avenue and Adams Street (now the home of the James Madison Institute).

In order to expand library services, the Junior League of Tallahassee donated a bookmobile to the library. The vehicle was later donated to the Leon County Sheriff's Office to be used as a paddywagon for its Road Prison. In 1962, the library moved to the old Elks Club building at 127 North Monroe Street. Public transit in the city of Tallahassee had been desegregated by 1958, but the public library system was only integrated several years later.

In the early 1970s, Jefferson and Wakulla Counties joined the Leon County Public Library System, forming the Leon, Jefferson, and Wakulla County Public Library System. According to the library's website, "Leon County provided administrative and other services to the two smaller counties, while each supported the direct costs of their library services and their share of Leon's administrative costs." In 1975 the system started a branch library in Bond, a predominantly black community on the city's south side. Wakulla County left the library cooperative in 1975 to start its own library system and in 1978 the main library moved to Tallahassee's Northwood Mall. Jefferson County left the library cooperative in 1980 and the library reverted to the Leon County Public Library. In 1989, "ground breaking was held on March 4 for a new $8.5 million main library facility with 88,000 feet of space. The site was next door to the library's original home, The Columns, which had been moved in 1971 to 100 N. Duval." The new library had its grand opening in 1991 and was renamed in 1993 in honor of former Governor LeRoy Collins.

Points of interest

 Alfred B. Maclay Gardens State Park
 Apalachicola National Forest
 Birdsong Nature Center
 Bradley's Country Store Complex
 Florida State Capitol
 Florida Supreme Court
 Florida State Archives
 Florida Vietnam War Memorial
 Lake Jackson Mounds Archaeological State Park
 Leon County Fairgrounds
 Leon County's five canopy roads
 LeRoy Collins Leon County Public Library
 Mission San Luis de Apalachee
 Museum of Florida History
 Old Fort Park
 Tall Timbers Research Station
 Tallahassee Antique Car Museum
 Tallahassee Museum
 Tallahassee-St. Marks Historic Railroad Trail State Park

Transportation

Airports
 Tallahassee Commercial Airport
 Tallahassee International Airport

Major highways

  Interstate 10
  U.S. Highway 27
  U.S. Highway 90
  U.S. Highway 319
  State Road 20
  State Road 61
  State Road 155
  State Road 263
  State Road 267
  State Road 363

Communities

City
 Tallahassee

Census-designated places
 Bradfordville
 Capitola
 Chaires
 Fort Braden
 Miccosukee
 Woodville

Other unincorporated communities

 Baum
 Belair
 Black Creek
 Bloxham
 Centerville
 Chaires Crossroads
 Felkel
 Gardner
 Iamonia
 Ivan
 Lafayette
 Lutterloh
 Meridian
 Ochlockonee
 Rose
 Wadesboro

Defunct entity
 Bond-South City, a former census-designated place enumerated by the United States Census Bureau in 1950 and 1960.

Notable people

 Wally Amos – founder of the "Famous Amos" chocolate chip cookie brand; actor
 Tony Hale – actor, played Byron "Buster" Bluth on Arrested Development
Isaac Jenkins (1846-1911), politician who served in the Florida House of Representatives in the 1880s
Jerrie Mock – aviator and first woman to fly around the world solo
T-Pain (born Faheem Najm) – hip hop and R&B singer
Ernest I. Thomas – raiser of the original flag at Iwo Jima

See also
 National Register of Historic Places listings in Leon County, Florida

References

External links

Government links/Constitutional offices
 Leon County Government / Board of County Commissioners
 Leon County Clerk of Courts
 Leon County Property Appraiser
 Leon County Sheriff's Office
 Leon County Supervisor of Elections
 Leon County Tax Collector

Special districts
 Leon County Public Schools
 The Ochlockonee River Soil and Water Conservation District
 Northwest Florida Water Management District

Judicial branch
 Leon County Clerk of Courts
 Public Defender, 2nd Judicial Circuit of Florida serving Franklin, Gadsden, Jefferson, Leon, Liberty, and Wakulla counties
 Office of the State Attorney, 2nd Judicial Circuit of Florida
 Circuit and County Court, 2nd Judicial Circuit of Florida

Tourism links
 http://www.VisitTallahassee.com

 
Charter counties in Florida
1824 establishments in Florida Territory
Populated places established in 1824
Tallahassee metropolitan area
North Florida